Jean-Claude Bourlès (22 November 1937, Rennes) is a French writer-traveler from Brittany.

A passionate with the camino de Santiago, he wrote three books on the subject, relating, for the first two, his own experience as a pilgrim of the path of paths, the third being a sort of collection of testimonies on the motivations of the many pilgrims he met.

As a writer he participated to many magazines such as Grands Reportages, Terre Sauvage, Pays de Bretagne.

His work Chronique du bel été earned him the Prix Louis-Guilloux in 1983.

Bibliography 
 1976: Les vents noirs, poems, Millas Martin
 1978: Cantilènes, poems, Chambelland
 1981: Fleurs vagabondes, poems, Michelle Brouta
 1981: Sillages d'hiver, poems, illustrations by Bernard Louedin, Éditions du Coq
 1982: Chronique du bel été, Picollec, Prix Louis-Guilloux
 1995: Retour à Conques, 
 1995: Sur les chemins de Compostelle, Payot
 1997: Louis Guilloux, les maisons d'encre, photographs by Jean Hervoche, Christian Pirot
 1998: Passants de Compostelle, Payot
 1998: Le grand chemin de Compostelle, Payot, Prix du Roman d'aventure
 1999: Une Bretagne intérieure, Flammarion
 2001: Pèlerin sans église, 
 2002: Guillaume Manier : un paysan picard à St-Jacques de Compostelle, Payot, 2002
 2003: Escapades avec Don Quichotte, Payot
 2005: Ma vie avec Sancho Pança, Payot
 2012: Le frisson des départs (in collaboration with Yvon Boëlle), Salvator

External links 
 Jean-Claude Bourlès: Le pèlerin de Compostelle se sent investi par les autres on Le Pèlerin
 Jean-Claude Bourlès, Écrivain, voyageur on Chemins d'étoiles
 BOURLES Jean Claude - Le grand chemin de Compostelle on Au Cœur du chemin 

20th-century French non-fiction writers
20th-century French male writers
21st-century French non-fiction writers
Prix Louis Guilloux winners
1937 births
Writers from Rennes
Living people